The 2020 Idaho Democratic presidential primary took place on March 10, 2020, as one of several states voting the week after Super Tuesday in the Democratic Party primaries for the 2020 presidential election. The Idaho primary required that voters would be registered Democrats or unaffiliated, and awarded 25 delegates towards the 2020 Democratic National Convention, of whom 20 were pledged delegates allocated on the basis of the primary results.

With only former vice president Joe Biden and senator Bernie Sanders left as relevant candidates after Super Tuesday, Biden won the primary with almost 49% of the vote, one of the narrower results of the day, and picked up 12 delegates over Bernie Sanders, who achieved around 42% of the vote and 8 delegates.

Procedure
Idaho was one of six states (along with Democrats Abroad) that held primaries on March 10, 2020, one week after Super Tuesday. On June 30, 2018, the Idaho Democratic Party announced at its state convention that it would switch from using caucuses to a state-run primary in 2020.

Voting took place throughout the state from 8:00 a.m. until 8:00 p.m. local time. In the primary, candidates had to meet a threshold of 15% at the congressional district or statewide level in order to be considered viable. The 20 pledged delegates to the 2020 Democratic National Convention were allocated proportionally on the basis of the primary results. Of these, between 6 and 7 were allocated to each of the state's 2 congressional districts and another 3 were allocated to party leaders and elected officials (PLEO delegates), in addition to 4 at-large delegates. The March primary as part of Stage I on the primary timetable received no bonus delegates, in order to disperse the primaries between more different date clusters and keep too many states from hoarding on a March date.

On April 4, 2020, county caucuses chose delegates to the state convention in Boise. The state convention on June 6, 2020 elected all 20 pledged delegates for the Democratic National Convention. The delegation also included 5 unpledged PLEO delegates: 5 members of the Democratic National Committee.

Candidates
The following candidates filed, paying a fee of $1,000, and were on the ballot in Idaho:

Running

Joe Biden
Steve Burke
Roque "Rocky" De La Fuente III
Tulsi Gabbard
Bernie Sanders

Withdrawn

Michael Bennet
Michael Bloomberg
Cory Booker
Pete Buttigieg
Julian Castro
John Delaney
Amy Klobuchar
Deval Patrick
Tom Steyer
Elizabeth Warren
Marianne Williamson
Andrew Yang

Kamala Harris and Brian Moore qualified, but had withdrawn early enough so that they were taken from the ballot.

Polling

Results

See also
 2020 Idaho Republican presidential primary

Notes

References

External links
The Green Papers delegate allocation summary
Idaho Democratic Party delegate selection plan 

Idaho Democratic
Democratic primary
2020